Yamacraw is an unincorporated community in Pender County, North Carolina, United States.

In popular culture
Yamacraw is the birthplace of the character Philip Banks on the television series The Fresh Prince of Bel-Air. In the 2022 reboot, it is the character's birthplace and fraternity nickname.

References

 

Unincorporated communities in Pender County, North Carolina
Unincorporated communities in North Carolina